Sandy Cove may refer to:

Ireland
Sandycove, a suburb of Dublin

Canada
 Sandy Cove, Newfoundland and Labrador
 Sandy Cove, Elliston, Newfoundland and Labrador
 Savage Cove, incorporating Sandy Cove, Great Northern Peninsula, Newfoundland
 Sandy Cove beach, Lord's Cove, Newfoundland and Labrador
 Sandy Cove, Digby, Nova Scotia
 Sandy Cove, Halifax, Nova Scotia
 Sandy Cove, Queens, Nova Scotia
 Sandy Cove, Ontario

See also